Hassan Muhammad Makki (22 December 1933 – 9 June 2016) was the Prime Minister of the Yemen Arab Republic for four months in 1974.  Makki was appointed by President Abdul Rahman al-Iryani.  He was replaced shortly after the coup d'état that placed Ibrahim al-Hamdi in power as Chairman of the Military Command Council.

Before and after his term as the Prime Minister he served as Deputy Prime Minister, Minister for Foreign Affairs or Minister for Economical Affairs several times between 1963 and 1980. He also has been sent as ambassador to Italy (1968–70, 1977–79), Western Germany (1970–72), to the United Nations (1974–76) and to the United States and Canada (1975–1976). Makki died on 9 June 2016, aged 82.

References

Literature
 Robert D. Burrowes: Historical Dictionary of Yemen, page 231f. Lanham 2010
 The International Who's Who 1988-89, page 972. Europa Plublications Limited, London 1988
 Sabih M. Shukri (publ.): The International Who's Who of the Arab World, page 338. London 1983

1933 births
2016 deaths
Prime Ministers of North Yemen
Foreign ministers of Yemen
Economy ministers of Yemen
Ambassadors of Yemen to Germany
Ambassadors of Yemen to Italy
Ambassadors of Yemen to the United States
Permanent Representatives of Yemen to the United Nations
Presidents of Sanaa University
20th-century Yemeni politicians
20th-century Yemeni diplomats
Ambassadors of Yemen to Austria
Attas Cabinet